Events from the year 1939 in Taiwan, Empire of Japan.

Incumbents

Central government of Japan
 Prime Minister: Fumimaro Konoe, Kiichirō Hiranuma, Nobuyuki Abe

Taiwan
 Governor-General – Seizō Kobayashi

Births
 2 January – Rai Hau-min, President of Judicial Yuan (2010–2016)
 3 January – Vincent Siew, Vice President of the Republic of China (2008–2012)
 10 February – Hsieh Shen-shan, Magistrate of Hualien County (2003–2009)
 16 March – Fan Kuang-chun, Governor of Taiwan Province (2002–2003)
 1 April – Ma Ju-lung, former actor
 27 May – Lin Rong-San, Taiwanese politician, publisher and businessman (d. 2015)
 19 June – Wu Po-hsiung, Chairman of Kuomintang (2007–2009)
 27 December – Hsu Jung-shu, Member of Legislative Yuan (1981–1984, 1993–2008)

References

 
Years of the 20th century in Taiwan